Hanuman Junction is a 2001 Indian Telugu-language action comedy film directed by M. Raja. It stars Arjun, Jagapathi Babu, Venu Thottempudi, Laya, Sneha and Vijayalakshmi with music composed by Suresh Peters. It is produced by M. V. Lakshmi under the M. L. Movie Arts banner of Editor Mohan. The film, notably Raja's directorial debut, is a remake of the 2000 Malayalam film Thenkasipattanam, directed by Rafi Mecartin. Released on 21 December 2001, the film was a successful venture.

Plot
The film begins with Krishna and Dasu the besties and the notorious goons of the Hanuman Junction who holds KD & Co company. They always have enmity with a vicious opponent Devudayya. Meenakshi daughter of Devudayya loves Krishna from childhood but he does not reciprocate it because he knows that Dasu won’t accept it. Meanwhile, Sathru a young guy appointed as manager in KD & Co is regularly struck by them because of his stupidity. Later, it is revealed that Dasu has a sister Devi an educated girl whom Krishna too endears as his own. Sathru is in love with Devi which she jilted. Thus, he joined in their company to win the hearts of Devi and her brothers. As KD & Co keeps hostage a music troupe for which Sangeeta the main singer is expelled from her house, KD shelters her.

Now, Devi affirms to Sathru that her brothers should be conjugal first. Therefore, he decides to find brides for Krishna & Dasu. With a revue, he unites Krishna with Meenakshi and also tries to patch up Sangeeta with Dasu. Here, surprisingly, she loves Krishna. Due to the obfuscation of Sathru Krishna accepts the proposal mistaking Sangeeta for Dasu’s finance. Soon, Krishna reveals his love affair to Dasu when he understands Meenakshi as his spouse and starts liking her. Afterward, they bring Meenakshi home confront Devudayya, and start wedding preparation. Anyhow, Sathru realizes the mishap and tries to rectify which leads to chaos. Exploiting it, Devudayya creates a rift between KD. During that plight, Dasu aims to forcibly knit Meenakshi when Krishna obstructs his way. Eventually, it results, in warfare between soul mates. At last, Krishna gets ready to give up his love for his friendship. However, Dasu changes his mind, bands Krishna and Meenakshi together, and decides to marry Sangeetha. Finally, the movie ends with the wedding of the three couples.

Cast

 Arjun as Krishna 
 Jagapati Babu as Dasu
 Venu Thottempudi as Ajaatasathru aka Sathru
 Laya as Sangeetha
 Sneha as Meenakshi
 Vijayalakshmi as Devi
 Jaya Prakash Reddy as Devudayya
 Brahmanandam as Sangeetha's uncle
 Kovai Sarala as Sangeetha's Aunt
 Ali as Janaganamana
 Venniradai Niramala as Devudayya's wife
 L.B. Sriram as Chakram
 Paruchuri Venteswara Rao 
 M. S. Narayana as Abbulu
 Venu Madhav as Devudayya's aide
 Rallapalli
 Besant Ravi as henchman
 Sri Divya (child artist)
 Sudeepa Pinky as Young Meenakshi

Production 
Principal photography began on 11 June 2001.

Soundtrack

Music composed by Suresh Peters who composed the original version retaining all the tunes from the original. Music released on Aditya Music Company.

Reception 
Sify rated the film 3/5 and called the film a "clean comedy." On performances, the reviewer wrote, "Venu as Sathru proves that he is excellent in comedy. Arjun as Krishna is perfect, but Jagapathi as Dasu could have been better." Idlebrain.com rated the film 3.25 and stated: "The story and relationships in this film are quite complex. But the whole credit should go to the debutant director Raja to narrate a story in such a way that all the viewers understand the complex and randomly changing relationships clearly."

References

External links 

Indian action comedy films
Telugu remakes of Malayalam films
2001 directorial debut films
2001 films
2001 action comedy films
Films directed by Mohan Raja
Films scored by Suresh Peters
2000s Telugu-language films
2001 comedy films